Patrick Gbala born June 12, 1993) is an Ivorian football player who plays as a midfielder. He played in the Saudi Professional League for Al-Fateh SC and in the Tunisian Ligue Professionnelle 1 for US Monastir.

References

1993 births
Living people
US Monastir (football) players
Al-Fateh SC players
Jeddah Club players
Wej SC players
Ivorian footballers
Expatriate footballers in Tunisia
Expatriate footballers in Saudi Arabia
Ivorian expatriate sportspeople in Tunisia
Ivorian expatriates in Saudi Arabia
Tunisian Ligue Professionnelle 1 players
Saudi Professional League players
Saudi First Division League players
Saudi Second Division players
Association football midfielders